Abronica abronia, common name graceful aeolid, is a species of sea slug, an aeolid nudibranch, a marine gastropod mollusc in the family Abronicidae.

Distribution
This species was described from Point Pinos, Monterey Bay, California, U.S. It has been recorded along the Eastern Pacific coastline of North America from Washington state to Baja California, Mexico.

References 

Abronicidae
Gastropods described in 1966